African-American culture, also termed as Black American Culture or Black Culture, refers to the contributions of African Americans to the culture of the United States, either as part of or distinct from mainstream American culture. The culture remains both distinct and enormously influential on American and global worldwide culture as a whole.

African-American culture is rooted in the enslavement of Black Americans, a brutal and dehumanizing era of American history that stripped Black Americans of their freedom and dignity. In addition, during the era of segregation African Americans faced systemic and violent racism that included exclusion from many aspects of American life and these experiences have also profoundly influenced African-American Culture. Moreover, even in the face of these significant challenges and other experiences of racial discrimination, African Americans have demonstrated extraordinary ingenuity in producing distinctive traditions and radical innovations in music, art, literature, religion, cuisine, and other fields. These cultural contributions have often served as powerful tools for advancing racial justice and have significantly shaped and continues to shape African-American culture.

African-American cultural history

From the earliest days of American slavery in the 17th century, slave owners sought to exercise control over their slaves by attempting to strip them of their African culture. In the New World in general and in the United States in particular, the physical isolation and the societal marginalization of African slaves and, later, the physical isolation and the societal marginalization of their free progeny facilitated the retention of significant elements of traditional culture among Africans. Slave owners deliberately tried to repress independent political or cultural organization in order to deal with the many slave rebellions or acts of resistance that took place in the United States, Brazil, Haiti, and the Dutch Guyanas.

African cultures, slavery, slave rebellions, and the civil rights movement have all shaped African-American religious, familial, political, and economic behaviors. The imprint of Africa is evident in a myriad of ways: in politics, economics, language, music, hairstyles, fashion, dance, religion, cuisine, and worldview.

In turn, African-American culture has had a pervasive and transformative impact on many elements of mainstream American culture. This process of mutual creative exchange is called creolization. Over time, the culture of African slaves and their descendants has been ubiquitous in its impact on not only the dominant American culture, but on world culture as well.

Oral tradition

The Slaveholders limited or prohibited the education of enslaved African-Americans because they feared that it might empower their chattel and inspire or enable emancipatory ambitions. In the United States, the legislation that banned slaves from getting a formal education likely contributed to their maintenance of a strong oral tradition, a common feature of indigenous or native African culture. African-based oral traditions became the primary means of preserving history, mores, and other cultural information among the people. This was consistent with the griot practices of oral history in many native African culture and other cultures that did not rely on the written word. Many of these cultural elements have been passed from generation to generation through storytelling. The folktales provided African-Americans the opportunity to inspire and educate one another.

Examples of African American folktales include trickster tales of Br'er Rabbit and heroic tales such as that of John Henry. The Uncle Remus stories by Joel Chandler Harris helped to bring African-American folk tales into mainstream adoption. Harris did not appreciate the complexity of the stories nor their potential for a lasting impact on society. Other narratives that appear as important, recurring motifs in African-American culture are the "Signifying Monkey", "The Ballad of Shine", and the legend of Stagger Lee.

The legacy of the African-American oral tradition manifests in diverse forms. African-American preachers tend to perform rather than simply speak. The emotion of the subject is carried through the speaker's tone, volume, and cadence, which tend to mirror the rising action, climax, and descending action of the sermon. The meaning of this manner of preaching is not easily understood by European Americans or others of non-African origin. Often song, dance, verse, and structured pauses are placed throughout the sermon. Call and response is another element of the African-American oral tradition. It manifests in worship in what is commonly referred to as the "amen corner". In direct contrast to the tradition present in American and European cultures, it is an acceptable and common audience reaction to interrupt and affirm the speaker. This pattern of interaction is also in evidence in music, particularly in blues and jazz forms. Hyperbolic and provocative, even incendiary, rhetoric is another aspect of African-American oral tradition often evident in the pulpit in a tradition sometimes referred to as "prophetic speech".

Modernity and migration of African American communities to the North has had a history of placing strain on the retention of African American cultural practices and traditions. The urban and radically different spaces in which black culture was being produced raised fears in anthropologists and sociologists that the southern African American folk aspect of black popular culture were at risk of being lost within history. The study over the fear of losing black popular cultural roots from the South have a topic of interest to many anthropologists, who among them include Zora Neale Hurston. Through her extensive studies of Southern folklore and cultural practices, Hurston has claimed that the popular Southern folklore traditions and practices are not dying off. Instead they are evolving, developing, and re-creating themselves in different regions.

Other aspects of African-American oral tradition include the dozens, signifying, trash talk, rhyming, semantic inversion and word play, many of which have found their way into mainstream American popular culture and become international phenomena.

Spoken-word poetry is another example of how the African-American oral tradition has influenced modern popular culture. Spoken-word artists employ the same techniques as African-American preachers including movement, rhythm, and audience participation. Rap music from the 1980s and beyond has been seen as an extension of African oral culture.

Harlem Renaissance

The first major public recognition of African-American culture occurred during the Harlem Renaissance pioneered by Alain Locke. In the 1920s and 1930s, African-American music, literature, and art gained wide notice. Authors such as Zora Neale Hurston and Nella Larsen and poets such as Langston Hughes, Claude McKay, and Countee Cullen wrote works describing the African-American experience. Jazz, swing, blues and other musical forms entered American popular music. African-American artists such as William H. Johnson, Aaron Douglas, and Palmer Hayden created unique works of art featuring African Americans.

The Harlem Renaissance was also a time of increased political involvement for African Americans. Among the notable African-American political movements founded in the early 20th century are the Universal Negro Improvement Association and the National Association for the Advancement of Colored People. The Nation of Islam, a notable quasi-Islamic religious movement, also began in the early 1930s.

African-American cultural movement

The Black Power movement of the 1960s and 1970s followed in the wake of the non-violent Civil Rights Movement. The movement promoted racial pride and ethnic cohesion in contrast to the focus on integration of the Civil Rights Movement, and adopted a more militant posture in the face of racism. It also inspired a new renaissance in African-American literary and artistic expression generally referred to as the African-American or "Black Arts Movement".

The works of popular recording artists such as Nina Simone ("Young, Gifted and Black") and The Impressions ("Keep On Pushing"), as well as the poetry, fine arts, and literature of the time, shaped and reflected the growing racial and political consciousness. Among the most prominent writers of the African-American Arts Movement were poet Nikki Giovanni; poet and publisher Don L. Lee, who later became known as Haki Madhubuti; poet and playwright Leroi Jones, later known as Amiri Baraka; and Sonia Sanchez. Other influential writers were Ed Bullins, Dudley Randall, Mari Evans, June Jordan, Larry Neal, and Ahmos Zu-Bolton.

Another major aspect of the African-American Arts Movement was the infusion of the African aesthetic, a return to a collective cultural sensibility and ethnic pride that was much in evidence during the Harlem Renaissance and in the celebration of Négritude among the artistic and literary circles in the US, Caribbean, and the African continent nearly four decades earlier: the idea that "black is beautiful". During this time, there was a resurgence of interest in, and an embrace of, elements of African culture within African-American culture that had been suppressed or devalued to conform to Eurocentric America. Natural hairstyles, such as the afro, and African clothing, such as the dashiki, gained popularity. More importantly, the African-American aesthetic encouraged personal pride and political awareness among African Americans.

Music

African-American music is rooted in the typically polyrhythmic music of the ethnic groups of Africa, specifically those in the Western, Sahelean, and Central and Southern regions. African oral traditions, nurtured in slavery, encouraged the use of music to pass on history, teach lessons, ease suffering, and relay messages. The African pedigree of African-American music is evident in some common elements: call and response, syncopation, percussion, improvisation, swung notes, blue notes, the use of falsetto, melisma, and complex multi-part harmony. During slavery, Africans in America blended traditional European hymns with African elements to create spirituals. The banjo was the first African derived instrument to be played and built in the United States. Slaveholders discovered African-American slaves used drums to communicate.

Many African Americans sing "Lift Every Voice and Sing" in addition to the American national anthem, "The Star-Spangled Banner", or in lieu of it. Written by James Weldon Johnson and John Rosamond Johnson in 1900 to be performed for the birthday of Abraham Lincoln, the song was, and continues to be, a popular way for African Americans to recall past struggles and express ethnic solidarity, faith, and hope for the future. The song was adopted as the "Negro National Anthem" by the NAACP in 1919. Many African-American children are taught the song at school, church or by their families. "Lift Ev'ry Voice and Sing" traditionally is sung immediately following, or instead of, "The Star-Spangled Banner" at events hosted by African-American churches, schools, and other organizations.

In the 19th century, as the result of the blackface minstrel show, African-American music entered mainstream American society. By the early 20th century, several musical forms with origins in the African-American community had transformed American popular music. Aided by the technological innovations of radio and phonograph records, ragtime, jazz, blues, and swing also became popular overseas, and the 1920s became known as the Jazz Age. The early 20th century also saw the creation of the first African-American Broadway shows, films such as King Vidor's Hallelujah!, and operas such as George Gershwin's Porgy and Bess.

Rock and roll, doo wop, soul, and R&B developed in the mid-20th century. These genres became very popular in white audiences and were influences for other genres such as surf. During the 1970s, the dozens, an urban African-American tradition of using rhyming slang to put down one's enemies (or friends), and the African-American tradition of toasting developed into a new form of music. In the South Bronx the half speaking, half singing rhythmic street talk of "rapping" grew into the hugely successful cultural force known as hip hop.

Contemporary

Hip hop and contemporary R&B would become a multicultural movement, however, it still remained important to many African Americans. The African-American Cultural Movement of the 1960s and 1970s also fueled the growth of funk and later hip hop forms such as rap, hip house, new jack swing, and go-go. House music was created in black communities in Chicago in the 1980s. African-American music has experienced far more widespread acceptance in American popular music in the 21st century than ever before. In addition to continuing to develop newer musical forms, modern artists have also started a rebirth of older genres in the form of genres such as neo soul and modern funk-inspired groups.

Famous contemporary African American musicians include 50 Cent, Jay-Z, Alicia Keys, Usher, Mary J. Blige, Ne-Yo, Snoop Dogg and Kanye West.

The arts

Dance

African-American dance, like other aspects of African-American culture, finds its earliest roots in the dances of the hundreds of African ethnic groups that made up the enslaved African population in the Americas as well as in traditional folk dances from Europe. Dance in the African tradition, and thus in the tradition of slaves, was a part of both everyday life and special occasions. Many of these traditions such as get down, ring shouts, Akan Line Dancing and other elements of African body language survive as elements of modern dance.

In the 19th century, African-American dance began to appear in minstrel shows. These shows often presented African Americans as caricatures for ridicule to large audiences. The first African-American dance to become popular with white dancers was the cakewalk in 1891. Later dances to follow in this tradition include the Charleston, the Lindy Hop, the Jitterbug and the swing.

During the Harlem Renaissance, African-American Broadway shows such as Shuffle Along helped to establish and legitimize African-American dancers. African-American dance forms such as tap, a combination of African and European influences, gained widespread popularity thanks to dancers such as Bill Robinson and were used by leading white choreographers, who often hired African-American dancers.

Contemporary African-American dance is descended from these earlier forms and also draws influence from African and Caribbean dance forms. Groups such as the Alvin Ailey American Dance Theater have continued to contribute to the growth of this form. Modern popular dance in America is also greatly influenced by African-American dance. American popular dance has also drawn many influences from African-American dance most notably in the hip-hop genre.

One of the uniquely African-American forms of dancing, turfing, emerged from social and political movements in the East Bay in the San Francisco Bay Area. Turfing is a hood dance and a response to the loss of African-American lives, police brutality, and race relations in Oakland, California. The dance is an expression of Blackness, and one that integrates concepts of solidarity, social support, peace, and the discourse of the state of black people in our current social structures.

Twerking is an African-American dance similar to dances from Africa in Cote d’Ivoire, Senegal, Somalia and the Congo.

Art

From its early origins in slave communities, through the end of the 20th century, African-American art has made a vital contribution to the art of the United States. During the period between the 17th century and the early 19th century, art took the form of small drums, quilts, wrought-iron figures, and ceramic vessels in the southern United States. These artifacts have similarities with comparable crafts in West and Central Africa. In contrast, African-American artisans like the New England–based engraver Scipio Moorhead and the Baltimore portrait painter Joshua Johnson created art that was conceived in a thoroughly western European fashion. 

During the 19th century, Harriet Powers made quilts in rural Georgia, United States that are now considered among the finest examples of 19th-century Southern quilting. Later in the 20th century, the women of Gee's Bend developed a distinctive, bold, and sophisticated quilting style based on traditional African-American quilts with a geometric simplicity that developed separately but was like that of Amish quilts and modern art.

After the American Civil War, museums and galleries began more frequently to display the work of African-American artists. Cultural expression in mainstream venues was still limited by the dominant European aesthetic and by racial prejudice. To increase the visibility of their work, many African-American artists traveled to Europe where they had greater freedom. It was not until the Harlem Renaissance that more European Americans began to pay attention to African-American art in America.

During the 1920s, artists such as Raymond Barthé, Aaron Douglas, Augusta Savage, and photographer James Van Der Zee became well known for their work. During the Great Depression, new opportunities arose for these and other African-American artists under the WPA. In later years, other programs and institutions, such as the New York City-based Harmon Foundation, helped to foster African-American artistic talent. Augusta Savage, Elizabeth Catlett, Lois Mailou Jones, Romare Bearden, Jacob Lawrence, and others exhibited in museums and juried art shows, and built reputations and followings for themselves.

In the 1950s and 1960s, there were very few widely accepted African-American artists. Despite this, The Highwaymen, a loose association of 27 African-American artists from Ft. Pierce, Florida, created idyllic, quickly realized images of the Florida landscape and peddled some 50,000 of them from the trunks of their cars. They sold their art directly to the public rather than through galleries and art agents, thus receiving the name "The Highwaymen". Rediscovered in the mid-1990s, today they are recognized as an important part of American folk history. Their artwork is widely collected by enthusiasts and original pieces can easily fetch thousands of dollars in auctions and sales.

The Black Arts Movement of the 1960s and 1970s was another period of resurgent interest in African-American art. During this period, several African-American artists gained national prominence, among them Lou Stovall, Ed Love, Charles White, and Jeff Donaldson. Donaldson and a group of African-American artists formed the Afrocentric collective AfriCOBRA, which remains in existence today. The sculptor Martin Puryear, whose work has been acclaimed for years, was being honored with a 30-year retrospective of his work at the Museum of Modern Art in New York in November 2007. Notable contemporary African-American artists include Willie Cole, David Hammons, Eugene J. Martin, Mose Tolliver, Reynold Ruffins, the late William Tolliver, and Kara Walker.

Ceramics
In Charleston, South Carolina, thirteen colonoware from the 18th century were found with folded strip roulette decorations. From the time of colonial America until the 19th century in the United States, African-Americans and their enslaved African ancestors, as well as Native Americans who were enslaved and not enslaved, were creating colonoware of this pottery style. Roulette decorated pottery likely originated in West Africa and in the northern region of Central Africa amid 2000 BCE. The longstanding pottery tradition, from which for the Charleston colonoware derives, likely began its initial development between 800 BCE and 400 BCE in Mali; thereafter, the pottery tradition expanded around 900 CE into the Lake Chad basin, into the southeastern region of Mauritania by 1200 CE, and, by the 19th century CE, expanded southward. More specifically, the pottery style for the Charleston colonoware may have been created by 18th century peoples (e.g., Kanuri people, Hausa people in Kano) of the Kanem–Bornu Empire. Within a broader context, following the 17th century enslavement of western Africans for the farming of rice in South Carolina, the Charleston colonoware may be understood as Africanisms from West/Central Africa, which endured the Middle Passage, and became transplanted into the local culture of colonial-era Lowcountry, South Carolina.

Symbolisms from Africa may have served as identity markers for enslaved African-American creators of stoneware. For example, David Drake’s signature marks (e.g., an "X", a slash) and well as Landrum crosses, which were developed by enslaved African-Americans and appear similar to Kongo cosmograms, are such examples from Edgefield County, South Carolina.

Literature

African-American literature has its roots in the oral traditions of African slaves in America. The slaves used stories and fables in much the same way as they used music. These stories influenced the earliest African-American writers and poets in the 18th century such as Phillis Wheatley and Olaudah Equiano. These authors reached early high points by telling slave narratives.

During the early 20th century Harlem Renaissance, numerous authors and poets, such as Langston Hughes, W. E. B. Du Bois, and Booker T. Washington, grappled with how to respond to discrimination in America. Authors during the Civil Rights Movement, such as Richard Wright, James Baldwin, and Gwendolyn Brooks wrote about issues of racial segregation, oppression, and other aspects of African-American life. This tradition continues today with authors who have been accepted as an integral part of American literature, with works such as Roots: The Saga of an American Family by Alex Haley, The Color Purple by Alice Walker, Beloved by Nobel Prize-winning Toni Morrison, and fiction works by Octavia Butler and Walter Mosley. Such works have achieved both best-selling and/or award-winning status.

Cinema

African-American films typically feature an African-American cast and are targeted at an African-American audience. More recently, Black films feature multicultural casts, and are aimed at multicultural audiences, even if American Blackness is essential to the storyline.

Museums

The African-American Museum Movement emerged during the 1950s and 1960s to preserve the heritage of the African-American experience and to ensure its proper interpretation in American history. Museums devoted to African-American history are found in many African-American neighborhoods. Institutions such as the African American Museum and Library at Oakland, The African American Museum in Cleveland and the Natchez Museum of African American History and Culture were created by African Americans to teach and investigate cultural history that, until recent decades, was primarily preserved through oral traditions.

Other prominent African-American museums include Chicago's DuSable Museum of African American History, and the National Museum of African American History and Culture, established in 2003 as part of the Smithsonian Institution in Washington, D.C.

Language

Generations of hardships created by the compounded institutions of slavery imposed upon the African-American community prevented the majority of them from learning to read or write English, despite this, enslaved Africans continued to carry their language systems and culture, creating distinct language patterns. Filtering the English they heard through their language systems and culture.

While traditionally understood to be generally factual that European owners of enslaved Africans often intentionally mixed Africans who spoke different languages to discourage communication in any language other than English, the truth is that Africans were strategically placed in certain types of settings. West Africans were primarily (not exclusively) placed in non-field work in the upper southern colonies and West Central/Central Africans were primarily (not exclusively) placed in field based work in the lower southern colonies.

Africans in primarily non-field work typically had extensive interaction with Europeans in the early period, with cultural influence being bi-directional.  Colonies typically preferred certain African ethnic groups, some very selective (South Carolina for example), others a bit more loose but still maintained a level of preference (Virginia for example). West Central and Central Africans brought with them a homogenous culture that superseded West African culture early on in establishing African American culture, at a later point in history, West African influence displays itself in African American culture.

Interaction between West Africans and West Central/Central Africans did occur, creating a lingua franca, however the culture of African Americans was heavily affected by the homogeneity and relatively isolated Bantu imported population. Later influence from West Africa presents itself in African American culture. African American speech however is heavily based (but not exclusively, includes West Africa to some extent) in Bantu culture, as such, it is responsible for African Americans' language patterns, combining an African substrate with the topical usage of primarily non-African words. 

African-American Vernacular English (AAVE) is touted to be a variety (dialect, ethnolect, and sociolect) of the American English language,  however, mainstream non-AAL/V linguists have traditionally and intentionally ignored or dismissed African language systems and culture, missing key associations and connections. Linguists and speakers of AAL (African American Language) have shown not only the grammatical structure of AAL being Niger-Congo, but the cultural/relational patterns within the language that are of African origin that characterize or color it. 

There exists convergence and commonality with many languages; these elements don't automatically indicate derivation. While AAVE is academically considered a legitimate dialect because of its logical structure, some of both whites and African Americans consider it slang or the result of a poor command of Standard American English, none of which is true; they are differences in languages. Many African Americans who were born outside the American South still speak with hints of AAVE or southern dialect. Inner-city African-American children who are isolated by speaking only AAVE sometimes have more difficulty with standardized testing and, after school, moving to the mainstream world for work. It is common for many speakers of AAVE to code switch between AAVE and Standard American English depending on the setting.

Fashion and aesthetics

Attire

The Black Arts Movement, a cultural explosion of the 1960s, saw the incorporation of surviving cultural dress with elements from modern fashion and West African traditional clothing to create a uniquely African-American traditional style. Kente cloth is the best known African textile. These colorful woven patterns, which exist in numerous varieties, were originally made by the Ashanti and Ewe peoples of Ghana and Togo. Kente fabric also appears in a number of Western style fashions ranging from casual T-shirts to formal bow ties and cummerbunds. Kente strips are often sewn into liturgical and academic robes or worn as stoles. Since the Black Arts Movement, traditional African clothing has been popular amongst African Americans for both formal and informal occasions. Other manifestations of traditional African dress in common evidence in African-American culture are vibrant colors, mud cloth, trade beads and the use of Adinkra motifs in jewelry and in couture and decorator fabrics.

Another common aspect of fashion in African-American culture involves the appropriate dress for worship in the Black church. It is expected in most churches that an individual present their best appearance for worship. African-American women in particular are known for wearing vibrant dresses and suits. An interpretation of a passage from the Christian Bible, "every woman who prays or prophesies with her head uncovered dishonors her head", has led to the tradition of wearing elaborate Sunday hats, sometimes known as "crowns".

Hip hop fashion is popular with African Americans. Grillz were made popular by African American rapper Nelly.
Sagging pants was a part of African American culture. Air Jordan, a shoe brand named after former African American basketball player Michael Jordan, is very popular among the African-American community.

African American fashion designers include Sean Combs, Kimora Lee Simmons, Virgil Abloh and Kanye West.

Hair

Hair styling in African-American culture is greatly varied. African-American hair is typically composed of coiled curls, which range from tight to wavy. Many women choose to wear their hair in its natural state. Natural hair can be styled in a variety of ways, including the afro, twist outs, braid outs, and wash and go styles. It is a myth that natural hair presents styling problems or is hard to manage; this myth seems prevalent because mainstream culture has, for decades, attempted to get African-American women to conform to its standard of beauty (i.e., straight hair). To that end, some women prefer straightening of the hair through the application of heat or chemical processes. Although this can be a matter of personal preference, the choice is often affected by straight hair being a beauty standard in the West and the fact that hair type can affect employment. However, more and more women are wearing their hair in its natural state and receiving positive feedback. Alternatively, the predominant and most socially acceptable practice for men is to leave one's hair natural.

Often, as men age and begin to lose their hair, the hair is either closely cropped, or the head is shaved completely free of hair. However, since the 1960s, natural hairstyles, such as the afro, braids, waves, fades, and dreadlocks, have been growing in popularity. Despite their association with radical political movements and their vast difference from mainstream Western hairstyles, the styles have attained considerable, but certainly limited, social acceptance.

Maintaining facial hair is more prevalent among African-American men than in other male populations in the US. In fact, the soul patch is so named because African-American men, particularly jazz musicians, popularized the style. The preference for facial hair among African-American men is due partly to personal taste, but also because they are more prone than other ethnic groups to develop a condition known as pseudofolliculitis barbae, commonly referred to as razor bumps, many prefer not to shave.

Body image
European-Americans have sometimes appropriated different hair braiding techniques and other forms of African-American hair. There are also individuals and groups who are working towards raising the standing of the African aesthetic among African Americans and internationally as well. This includes efforts toward promoting as models those with clearly defined African features; the mainstreaming of natural hairstyles; and, in women, fuller, more voluptuous body types.

Religion

While African Americans practice a number of religions, Protestant Christianity is by far the most prevalent (66%).

Christianity

The religious institutions of African-American Christians are commonly and collectively referred to as the black church. During the era of slavery, many slaves were stripped of their African belief systems and typically denied free religious practice, forced to become Christians. However, slaves managed to hang on to some of their traditional African religious practices by integrating them into Christian worship during secret meetings. These practices, including dance, shouts, African rhythms, and enthusiastic singing, remain a large part of worship in the African-American church.

African-American churches taught the belief that all people were equal in God's eyes and they also believed that the doctrine of obedience to one's master which was taught in white churches was hypocritical – yet they accepted and propagated internal hierarchies and supported the corporal punishment of children among other things. Instead, the African-American church focused on the message of equality and hopes for a better future. Before and after emancipation, racial segregation in America prompted the development of organized African-American denominations. The first of these was the AME Church founded by Richard Allen in 1787.

After the Civil War, the merger of three smaller Baptist groups formed the National Baptist Convention. This organization is the largest African-American Christian Denomination and it is also the second largest Baptist denomination in the United States. An African-American church is not necessarily a separate denomination. Several predominantly African-American churches exist as members of predominantly white denominations. African-American churches have served to provide African-American people with leadership positions and opportunities to organize that were denied to them by mainstream American society. Because of this, African-American pastors became the bridge between the African-American and European American communities, a leadership position which enabled them to play a crucial role during the Civil Rights Movement.

Like many Christians, African-American Christians sometimes participate in or attend a Christmas play. Black Nativity by Langston Hughes is a re-telling of the classic Nativity story with gospel music. Productions can be found in African-American theaters and churches all over the country.

Islam

Generations before the advent of the Atlantic slave trade, Islam was a thriving religion in West Africa due to its peaceful introduction via the lucrative Trans-Saharan trade between prominent tribes in the southern Sahara and the Arabs and Berbers in North Africa. In his attesting to this fact the West African scholar Cheikh Anta Diop explained: "The primary reason for the success of Islam in Black Africa ... consequently stems from the fact that it was propagated peacefully at first by solitary Arabo-Berber travelers to certain Black kings and notables, who then spread it about them to those under their jurisdiction". Many first-generation slaves were often able to retain their Muslim identity, their descendants were not. Slaves were either forcibly converted to Christianity as was the case in the Catholic lands or were besieged with gross inconveniences to their religious practice such as in the case of the Protestant American mainland.

In the decades after slavery and particularly during the depression era, Islam reemerged in the form of highly visible and sometimes controversial movements in the African-American community. The first of these of note was the Moorish Science Temple of America, founded by Noble Drew Ali. Ali had a profound influence on Wallace Fard, who later founded the Black nationalist Nation of Islam in 1930. Elijah Muhammad became head of the organization in 1934. Much like Malcolm X, who left the Nation of Islam in 1964, many African-American Muslims now follow traditional Islam.

Many former members of the Nation of Islam converted to Sunni Islam when Warith Deen Mohammed took control of the organization after his father's death in 1975 and taught its members the traditional form of Islam based on the Qur'an. A survey by the Council on American-Islamic Relations shows that 30% of Sunni Mosque attendees are African Americans. In fact, most African-American Muslims are orthodox Muslims, as only 2% are of the Nation of Islam.

Judaism

There are 150,000 African Americans in the United States who practice Judaism. Some of these are members of mainstream Jewish groups like the Reform, Conservative, or Orthodox branches of Judaism; others belong to non-mainstream Jewish groups like the Black Hebrew Israelites. The Black Hebrew Israelites are a collection of African-American religious organizations whose practices and beliefs are partially derived from Judaism. Their varied teachings often include the belief that African Americans are descended from the biblical Israelites.

In the last 10 to 15 years, studies have shown that there has been a major increase in the number of African-Americans who identify themselves as being Jewish. Rabbi Capers Funnye, the first cousin of Michelle Obama, says in response to skepticism by some on people being African-American and Jewish at the same time, "I am a Jew, and that breaks through all color and ethnic barriers."

Other religions
Aside from Christianity, Islam, and Judaism, there are also African Americans who practice Buddhism and a number of other religions. There is a small but growing number of African Americans who participate in Syncretic Religions, such as Voodoo, Santería, Hoodoo, Ifá and diasporic traditions like the Rastafari movement. Many of them are immigrants or the descendants of immigrants from the Caribbean and South America, where these are practiced. Because of religious practices, such as animal sacrifice, which are no longer common among the larger American religions, these groups may be negatively viewed and they are sometimes the victims of harassment. It must be stated, however, that since the Supreme Court judgement that was given to the Lukumi Babaluaye church of Florida in 1993, there has been no major legal challenge to their right to function as they see fit.

In Louisiana, some African Americans practice Louisiana Voodoo.

Irreligious beliefs
In a 2008 Pew Forum survey, 12% of African Americans described themselves as being nothing in particular (11%), agnostic (1%), or atheist (<0.5%).

Life events 
For most African Americans, the observance of life events follows the pattern of mainstream American culture. While African Americans and whites often lived to themselves for much of American history, both groups generally had the same perspective on American culture. There are some traditions that are unique to African Americans.

Some African Americans have created new rites of passage that are linked to African traditions. Some pre-teen and teenage boys and girls take classes to prepare them for adulthood. These classes tend to focus on spirituality, responsibility, and leadership. Many of these programs are modeled after traditional African ceremonies, with the focus largely on embracing African cultures.

To this day, some African-American couples choose to "jump the broom" as a part of their wedding ceremony. Some sources claim that this practice can be traced back to Ghana. However, other sources argue that the African American tradition of "jumping the broom" is far more similar to the tradition in England. Although, this tradition largely fell out of favor in the African-American community after the end of slavery, it has experienced a slight resurgence in recent years as some couples seek to reaffirm their African heritage.

Funeral traditions tend to vary based on a number of factors, including religion and location, but there are a number of commonalities. Probably the most important part of death and dying in the African-American culture is the gathering of family and friends. Either in the last days before death or shortly after death, typically any friends and family members that can be reached are notified. This gathering helps to provide spiritual and emotional support, as well as assistance in making decisions and accomplishing everyday tasks.

The spirituality of death is very important in African-American culture. A member of the clergy or members of the religious community, or both, are typically present with the family through the entire process. Death is often viewed as transitory rather than final. Many services are called homegoings or homecomings, instead of funerals, based on the belief that the person is going home to the afterlife; "Returning to God" or the earth. The entire end of life process is generally treated as a celebration of the person's life, deeds and accomplishments – the "good things" rather than a mourning of loss. This is most notably demonstrated in the New Orleans jazz funeral tradition where upbeat music, dancing, and food encourage those gathered to be happy and celebrate the homegoing of a beloved friend.

Cuisine

In studying of the African American culture, food cannot be left out as one of the mediums to understand their traditions, religion, interaction, and social and cultural structures of their community. Observing the ways they prepare their food and eat their food ever since the enslaved era, reveals about the nature and identity of African American culture in the United States. Derek Hicks examines the origins of "gumbo", which is considered a soul food to many African Americans, in his reference to the intertwinement of food and culture in African American community. No written evidence are found historically about the gumbo or its recipes, so through the African American's nature of orally passing their stories and recipes down, gumbo came to represent their truly communal dish. Gumbo is said to be "an invention of enslaved Africans and African Americans" in Louisiana.

The cultivation and use of many agricultural products in the United States, such as yams, peanuts, rice, okra, sorghum, indigo dyes, and cotton, can be traced to African influences. African-American foods reflect creative responses to racial and economic oppression and poverty. Under slavery, African Americans were not allowed to eat better cuts of meat, and after emancipation many were often too poor to afford them. During slavery, many African-Americans would take these sorts of leftover ingredients from their white owners, often less desirable cuts of meats and vegetables, and prepare them into a dish that has consistency between stew and soup. Through sharing of this food in churches with a gathering of their people, they not only shared the food, but also experience, feelings, attachment, and sense of unity that brings the community together.

Soul food, a hearty cuisine commonly associated with African Americans in the South (but also common to African Americans nationwide), makes creative use of inexpensive products procured through farming and subsistence hunting and fishing. Pig intestines are boiled and sometimes battered and fried to make chitterlings, also known as "chitlins". Ham hocks and neck bones provide seasoning to soups, beans and boiled greens.

Other common foods, such as fried chicken and fish, macaroni and cheese, cornbread, and hoppin' john (black-eyed peas and rice) are prepared simply. When the African-American population was considerably more rural than it generally is today, rabbit, opossum, squirrel, and waterfowl were important additions to the diet. Many of these food traditions are especially predominant in many parts of the rural South.

Traditionally prepared soul food is often high in fat, sodium, and starch. Highly suited to the physically demanding lives of laborers, farmhands and rural lifestyles generally, it is now a contributing factor to obesity, heart disease, and diabetes in a population that has become increasingly more urban and sedentary. As a result, more health-conscious African Americans are using alternative methods of preparation, eschewing trans fats in favor of natural vegetable oils and substituting smoked turkey for fatback and other, cured pork products; limiting the amount of refined sugar in desserts; and emphasizing the consumption of more fruits and vegetables than animal protein. There is some resistance to such changes, however, as they involve deviating from long culinary tradition.

Other soul foods African Americans cook is chicken and waffles and desserts like banana pudding, peach cobbler, red velvet cake and sweet potato pie. Kool-Aid is considered a soul food beverage.

Okra came from Ethiopia and Eritrea. Rice, common to Lowcountry region of South Carolina and Georgia, was imported from the island of Madagascar. Soul food is similar to gypsy cooking in Europe. The roots of soul food are spread up and down the West Coast of Africa, including countries like Senegal, Guinea, Sierra Leone, Liberia, Ivory Coast, Ghana, Togo, Cameroon, Gabon, Nigeria and Angola, as well as in Western European countries such as Scotland, but the fruits can be found across America.

Holidays and observances

As with other American racial and ethnic groups, African Americans observe ethnic holidays alongside traditional American holidays. Holidays observed in African-American culture are not only observed by African Americans but are widely considered American holidays. The birthday of noted American civil rights leader Martin Luther King Jr. has been observed nationally since 1983. It is one of four federal holidays named for an individual.

Black History Month is another example of another African-American observance that has been adopted nationally and its teaching is even required by law in some states. Black History Month is an attempt to focus attention on previously neglected aspects of the American history, chiefly the lives and stories of African Americans. It is observed during the month of February to coincide with the founding of the NAACP and the birthdays of Frederick Douglass, a prominent African-American abolitionist, and Abraham Lincoln, the United States president who signed the Emancipation Proclamation.

On June 7, 1979, President Jimmy Carter decreed that June would be the month of black music. For the past 28 years, presidents have announced to Americans that Black Music Month (also called African-American Music Month) should be recognized as a critical part of American heritage. Black Music Month is highlighted with various events urging citizens to revel in the many forms of music from gospel to hip-hop. African-American musicians, singers, and composers are also highlighted for their contributions to the nation's history and culture.

Less-widely observed outside of the African-American community is Emancipation Day popularly known as Juneteenth or Freedom Day, in recognition of the official reading of the Emancipation Proclamation on June 19, 1865, in Texas. Juneteenth is a day when African Americans reflect on their unique history and heritage. It is one of the fastest growing African-American holidays with observances in the United States. Juneteenth was recognized as federal holiday in 2021, and was first observed as such on June 19, 2021.

Another holiday not widely observed outside of the African-American community is the birthday of Malcolm X. The day is observed on May 19 in American cities with a significant African-American population, including Washington, D.C.

Another noted African-American holiday is Kwanzaa. Like Emancipation Day, it is not widely observed outside of the African-American community, although it is growing in popularity with both African-American and African communities. African-American scholar and activist "Maulana" Ron Karenga invented the festival of Kwanzaa in 1966, as an alternative to the increasing commercialization of Christmas. Derived from the harvest rituals of Africans, Kwanzaa is observed each year from December 26 through January 1. Participants in Kwanzaa celebrations affirm their African heritage and the importance of family and community by drinking from a unity cup; lighting red, black, and green candles; exchanging heritage symbols, such as African art; and recounting the lives of people who struggled for African and African-American freedom.

Names

Although many African-American names are common among the larger population of the United States, distinct naming trends have emerged within African-American culture. Prior to the 1950s and 1960s, most African-American names closely resembled those used within European American culture. A dramatic shift in naming traditions began to take shape in the 1960s and 1970s in America. With the rise of the mid-century Civil Rights Movement, there was a dramatic rise in names of various origins. The practice of adopting neo-African or Islamic names gained popularity during that era. Efforts to recover African heritage inspired selection of names with deeper cultural significance. Before this, using African names was uncommon because African Americans were several generations removed from the last ancestor to have an African name, as slaves were often given the names of their enslavers, which were of European origin.

African-American names have origins in many languages including French, Latin, English, Arabic, and African languages. One very notable influence on African-American names is the Muslim religion. Islamic names entered the popular culture with the rise of The Nation of Islam among Black Americans with its focus on civil rights. The popular name "Aisha" has origins in the Qur'an. Despite the origins of these names in the Muslim religion and the place of the Nation of Islam in the civil rights movement, many Muslim names such as Jamal and Malik entered popular usage among Black Americans simply because they were fashionable, and many Islamic names are now commonly used by African Americans regardless of their religion. Names of African origin began to crop up as well. Names like Ashanti, Tanisha, Aaliyah, Malaika have origins in the continent of Africa.

By the 1970s and 1980s, it had become common within the culture to invent new names, although many of the invented names took elements from popular existing names.

Even with the rise of creative names, it is also still common for African Americans to use biblical, historic, or European names.

Family

When slavery was practiced in the United States, it was common for families to be separated through sale. Even during slavery, however, many African-American families managed to maintain strong familial bonds. Free African men and women, who managed to buy their own freedom by being hired out, who were emancipated, or who had escaped their masters, often worked long and hard to buy the members of their families who remained in bondage and send for them.

Others, separated from blood kin, formed close bonds based on fictive kin; play relations, play aunts, cousins, and the like. This practice, a holdover from African oral traditions such as sanankouya, survived Emancipation, with non-blood family friends commonly accorded the status and titles of blood relations. This broader, more African concept of what constitutes family and community, and the deeply rooted respect for elders that is part of African traditional societies, may be the genesis of the common use of the terms like "cousin" (or "cuz"), "aunt", "uncle", "brother", "sister", "Mother", and "Mama" when addressing other African-American people, some of whom may be complete strangers.

African-American family structure

Immediately after slavery, African-American families struggled to reunite and rebuild what had been taken. As late as 1960, when most African Americans lived under some form of segregation, 78 percent of African-American families were headed by married couples. This number steadily declined during the latter half of the 20th century. For the first time since slavery, a majority of African-American children live in a household with only one parent, typically the mother.

This apparent weakness is balanced by mutual-aid systems established by extended family members to provide emotional and economic support. Older family members pass on social and cultural traditions such as religion and manners to younger family members. In turn, the older family members are cared for by younger family members when they cannot care for themselves. These relationships exist at all economic levels in the African-American community, providing strength and support both to the African-American family and the community.

African Americans are less likely to own a pet.

Interracial marriages have increased for African Americans since Loving Vs. Virginia.

Fifty six percent of African American children are born to unmarried mothers. African American parents are more likely to be strict and to hold demanding standards for behavior. In 1998, 1.4 million African American children lived in a grandparent's home.

Politics and social issues
Since the passing of the Voting Rights Act of 1965, African Americans are voting and being elected to public office in increasing numbers.  the United States had approximately 10,000 African-American elected officials.
African Americans overwhelmingly associate with the Democratic Party. Only 11 percent of African Americans supported for George W. Bush in the 2004 Presidential Election. In 2016, only 8% of African Americans voted for Republican Donald Trump while 88% of African Americans voted for Democrat Hillary Clinton.

Social issues such as racial profiling, racial disparities in sentencing, higher rates of poverty, lower access to health care and institutional racism in general are important to the African-American community. While the divide on racial and fiscal issues has remained consistently wide for decades, seemingly indicating a wide social divide, African Americans tend to hold the same optimism and concern for America as any other ethnic group.

African-Americans may express political and social sentiments through hip-hop culture, including graffiti, break-dancing, rapping, and more. This cultural movement makes statements about historical, as well as present-day topics like street culture and incarceration, and oftentimes expresses a call for change. Hip-hop artists play a prominent role in activism and in fighting social injustices, and have a cultural role in defining and reflecting on political and social issues.

Prominent leaders in the Black church have demonstrated against gay-rights issues such as gay marriage. This stands in stark contrast to the down-low phenomenon of covert male–male sexual acts. Some within the African-American community take a different position, notably the late Coretta Scott King and the Reverend Al Sharpton. Sharpton, when asked in 2003 whether he supported gay marriage, replied that he might as well have been asked if he supported black marriage or white marriage.

African-American LGBT culture

The Black LGBT community refers to the African-American (Black) population who are members of the LGBT community, as a community of marginalized individuals who are further marginalized within their own community. Surveys and research have shown that 80% of African Americans say gays and lesbians endure discrimination compared to the 61% of whites. Black members of the community are not only seen as "other" due to their race, but also due to their sexuality, so they always had to combat racism and homophobia.

Black LGBT first started to be visible during the Harlem Renaissance when a subculture of LGBTQ African-American artists and entertainers emerged. This included people like Alain Locke, Countee Cullen, Langston Hughes, Claude McKay, Wallace Thurman, Richard Bruce Nugent, Bessie Smith, Ma Rainey, Moms Mabley, Mabel Hampton, Alberta Hunter, and Gladys Bentley. Places like Savoy Ballroom and the Rockland Palace hosted drag-ball extravaganzas with prizes awarded for the best costumes. Langston Hughes depicted the balls as "spectacles of color". Historian George Chauncey, author of Gay New York: Gender, Urban Culture, and the Making of the Gay Male World, 1890–1940, wrote that during this period "perhaps nowhere were more men willing to venture out in public in drag than in Harlem".

African-American population centers

African-American neighborhoods are types of ethnic enclaves found in many cities in the United States. The formation of African-American neighborhoods is closely linked to the history of segregation in the United States, either through formal laws, or as a product of social norms. Despite this, African-American neighborhoods have played an important role in the development of nearly all aspects of both African-American culture and broader American culture.

Wealthy African-American communities

Many affluent African-American communities exist today, including the following: Woodmore, Maryland; Hillcrest, Rockland County, New York; Redan and Cascade Heights, Georgia; Mitchellville, Maryland; Converse, Texas, Missouri City, Texas; Desoto, Texas; Quinby, South Carolina; Forest Park, Oklahoma; and Mount Airy, Pennsylvania.

Ghettos

Due to segregated conditions and widespread poverty, some African-American neighborhoods in the United States have been called "ghettos". The use of this term is controversial and, depending on the context, potentially offensive. Despite mainstream America's use of the term "ghetto" to signify a poor urban area populated by ethnic minorities, those living in the area often used it to signify something positive. The African-American ghettos did not always contain dilapidated houses and deteriorating projects, nor were all of its residents poverty-stricken. For many African Americans, the ghetto was "home", a place representing authentic "blackness" and a feeling, passion, or emotion derived from the rising above the struggle and suffering of being of African descent in America.

Langston Hughes relays in the "Negro Ghetto" (1931) and "The Heart of Harlem" (1945): "The buildings in Harlem are brick and stone/And the streets are long and wide,/But Harlem's much more than these alone,/Harlem is what's inside." Playwright August Wilson used the term "ghetto" in Ma Rainey's Black Bottom (1984) and Fences (1987), both of which draw upon the author's experience growing up in the Hill District of Pittsburgh, an African-American ghetto.

Although African-American neighborhoods may suffer from civic disinvestment, with lower-quality schools, less-effective policing and fire protection, there are institutions such as churches and museums and political organizations that help to improve the physical and social capital of African-American neighborhoods. In African-American neighborhoods the churches may be important sources of social cohesion. For some African Americans, the kind spirituality learned through these churches works as a protective factor against the corrosive forces of racism. Museums devoted to African-American history are also found in many African-American neighborhoods.

Many African-American neighborhoods are located in inner cities, and these are the mostly residential neighborhoods located closest to the central business district. The built environment is often row houses or brownstones, mixed with older single-family homes that may be converted to multi-family homes. In some areas there are larger apartment buildings. Shotgun houses are an important part of the built environment of some southern African-American neighborhoods. The houses consist of three to five rooms in a row with no hallways. This African-American house design is found in both rural and urban southern areas, mainly in African-American communities and neighborhoods.

Social networks

There are African American social networking websites such as BlackPlanet. Social media is an important political outlet for African Americans. African American teenagers are the biggest users of Instagram and SnapChat.

See also

 African-American beauty
 African-American dance
 African-American folktales
 African-American history
 African-American newspapers
 African diaspora
 Africanisms
 American culture
 Appropriations of African-American Culture
 Archives of African American Music and Culture
 Black Southerners
 Cuisine of the United States
 Culture of North America
 Culture of the United States
 History of North America
 History of the United States
 Civil rights movement (1865–1896)
 Civil rights movement (1896–1954)
 Civil rights movement
 Civil rights movement in popular culture
 Commemorations of Benjamin Banneker
 Cool (aesthetic) § African Americans
 Culture of the Southern United States
 History of the Southern United States
 Historically black colleges and universities
 Imaging Blackness
 Mythology of Benjamin Banneker
 National Museum of African American History and Culture
 Racism against African Americans
 Racism in the United States
 Black Twitter
 Hood film
 Mardi Gras Indians
 Pan-African flag
 Hip hop activism
 Hip hop fashion
 Black veganism
 Black Catholicism
 Auburn Avenue Research Library on African American Culture and History
 African-American Flag
 Black sitcom
 Culture of Africa
 Native American cultures in the United States
 Ghetto fabulous
 Christian hip hop
 Year of Return, Ghana 2019
 Black Gospel music
 Black doll
 Black science fiction
 Lean (drug)
 Culture of New Orleans
 Culture of Louisiana
 Culture of Georgia (U.S. state)
 Culture of Texas
 Culture of Arkansas
Native American cultures in the United States
 Wigger
 Romani culture 
 White American culture

References

Bibliography
 Hamilton, Marybeth: In Search of the Blues.
 William Ferris; Give My Poor Heart Ease: Voices of the Mississippi Blues – The University of North Carolina Press; (2009)  (with CD and DVD)
 William Ferris; Glenn Hinson The New Encyclopedia of Southern Culture: Volume 14: Folklife, University of North Carolina Press (2009)  (Cover :photo of James Son Thomas)
 William Ferris; Blues From The Delta – Da Capo Press; revised edition (1988) 
 Ted Gioia; Delta Blues: The Life and Times of the Mississippi Masters Who Revolutionized American Music – W. W. Norton & Company (2009) 
Sheldon Harris; Blues Who's Who Da Capo Press, 1979
 Robert Nicholson; Mississippi Blues Today! Da Capo Press (1999) 
 Robert Palmer; Deep Blues: A Musical and Cultural History of the Mississippi Delta – Penguin Reprint edition (1982) 
 Frederic Ramsey Jr.; Been Here And Gone – 1st edition (1960) Rutgers University Press – London Cassell (UK) and New Brunswick, New Jersey; 2nd printing (1969) Rutgers University Press New Brunswick, New Jersey; (2000) University of Georgia Press
 Wiggins, David K. and Ryan A. Swanson, eds. Separate Games: African American Sport behind the Walls of Segregation. University of Arkansas Press, 2016. xvi, 272 pp. 
 Charles Reagan Wilson, William Ferris, Ann J. Adadie; Encyclopedia of Southern Culture (1656 pp) University of North Carolina Press; 2nd edition (1989) – 

African-American cultural history
African-American society
Culture of the Southern United States